Lewis Archer Boswell (May 9, 1834 – November 26, 1909) was an early aviation pioneer who some believe made the first powered heavier-than-air flight, before the Wright Brothers.

Biography
Born May 9, 1834 in Lunenburg County, Virginia, Boswell went to study at Thomas Jefferson University and later Johns Hopkins University, earning his medical degree.  During the Civil War, he worked as a Confederate surgeon in Richmond, Virginia.

In 1868 Boswell began experimenting in aeronautics, but supposedly threw his small model into the Yazoo River that same year. It is unknown why he did this, although speculation points to the purpose of hiding his plans or ending local ridicule.

While he continued his study until his death on November 26, 1909, it is unknown if he ever built a full-scale model and attempted flight.   In 1900, he wrote a letter to the Secretary of War, asking for funding and promising results, but it was rejected.   Locals in his area have made claims that he actually did fly in November 1902, beating the Wright Brothers by a year.  In fact, at the time of his death, Boswell was pursuing  lawsuit against them, but this action was never carried through by his estate.  Other stories tell that he made a short flight after being rolled off a barn roof back in the mid-1890s.  However, no conclusive proof has surfaced to support these claims.

Legacy
In 2002, the local airport in Talladega, Alabama was renamed Boswell Field in honor of the local aviator, and according to the Airport Board Chairman, if Boswell made the first heavier than air flight, that would make Boswell Field the first airport.

See also
Wright Brothers
Early flying machines

References
Alabama Aviator
Talladega Daily Home
Anniston Star
Service in Civil War

External links

1834 births
1909 deaths
Aviation inventors
19th-century American inventors
People from Lunenburg County, Virginia
People from Eastaboga, Alabama
Confederate States Army surgeons